C. O. Anto was an Indian film singer in Malayalam cinema during the 1960s and 1970s. His first film song was "Kummiyadikkuvin" for the movie Kadalamma in 1963.  He has sung 178 Malayalam songs from 160 films. His popular songs were 
"Madhurikkum Ormakale", "Kummiyadikkuvin", "Chingakkulirkatte Agnipushpam", "Kannillathoru Kadalppalam" (drama) and "Vasantharavin". He died on 24 February 2001.

Anto received the Kerala Sangeetha Nataka Akademi Award in 1998 for his overall contribution to light music.

Filmography

As an actor
 Odayil Ninnu (1965)

Partial Discography
 Kummiyadikkuvin ...	Kadalamma	1963	
 Unnanam Uranganam ...	Oraal Koodi Kallanaayi	2124	
 Veedinu Ponmani ...	Kudumbini	1964	
 Thinthaare Thinthaare ...	Kaattuthulasi	1965	
 Pathupara Vithupaadu ...	Inapraavukal	1965	
 Padachavanundenkil ...	Daaham	1965	
 Kadukolam Theeyundengil ...	Thirichadi	1968	
 Kakkakkarumbikale ...	Ezhu Raathrikal	1968	
 Thedukayaanellaarum ...	Pengal	1968	
 Kunnathoru Kaavundu ...	Asuravithu	1968	
 Theyyam Theyyam ...	Asuravithu	1968	
 Kunkuma Maram Vetti ...	Asuravithu	1968	
 Panamoru Ballaatha ...	Lakshaprabhu	1968	
 Ice Cream ...	Vidyaarthi	1968	
 Pachilakkili ...	Vidyaarthi	1968	
 Sindabad ...	Vidyaarthi	1968	
 Bhoogolam Thiriyunnu ...	Padunna Puzha	1968	
 Amme Mahaakaaliyamme ...	Love In Kerala	1968
 Madhurikkum ormakale

References

External links

Malayalam playback singers
Indian male playback singers
20th-century Indian male singers
20th-century Indian singers
Singers from Kochi
Film musicians from Kerala
Male Carnatic singers
Carnatic singers
Recipients of the Kerala Sangeetha Nataka Akademi Award